Rusty-Jake Rodriguez (born 24 December 2000) is a professional Austrian darts player who plays in Professional Darts Corporation events. In 2017, he was the inaugural winner of the JDC (Junior Darts Corporation) World Championship.

Career
Rodriguez entered PDC qualifying school in 2017. His best result was getting to the last 64 on day four. This was not good enough to get a PDC tour card. He won a PDC Development Tour event in Germany in 2017, as well as the WDF Europe Cup Youth Pairs Boys with Thomas Langer in the same year. Rusty and his brothers Rowby-John and Roxy-James qualified for the 2017 Austrian Darts Open. This was Rusty's European tour debut. Rusty lost in the second round, while his brothers lost in the first round. Rusty was the first player to win the JDC World Championship in 2017 after he defeated Owen Roelofs 5–4 in legs. He failed to qualify for the 2018 PDC World Championship after he lost 4–5 to Terry Temple in the first round of the World Championship qualifiers.

Rodriguez entered European qualifying school in 2018. His best result was getting to the semi final on day three. Only one player per day got an automatic PDC tour card in the European qualifying school. Rusty came 10th in the PDC European qualifying school Order of Merit but only the top six in the PDC European qualifying school Order of Merit got a PDC tour card.

World Championship results

PDC 
 2022: Second round (lost to Chris Dobey 2–3) (sets)

Personal life
His brothers, Rowby-John and Roxy-James, are also dart players.

Performance timeline

PDC European Tour

References

External links
Profile and stats on Darts Database

2000 births
Living people
Austrian darts players
Game players from Vienna
Professional Darts Corporation current tour card holders